Metaferia Zeleke (born 1971) is a former Ethiopian long-distance runner who won a gold medal at the 1988 World Junior Championships in Sudbury in the 20 km road race event.

Achievements

References

1971 births
Living people
Ethiopian male long-distance runners
World Athletics U20 Championships winners
20th-century Ethiopian people
21st-century Ethiopian people